Irvin Randle (born November 14, 1961) is an American teacher and fashion model. On the internet he's known for his stylish pictures, which earned him the title #MrStealYourGrandma. Irvin became famous when photos from his personal Instagram account, went viral. Irvin has since been featured in major Pop Culture magazines and media such as People, Cosmopolitan, Essence, TMZ and more. On July 8, 2016, Irvin appeared on The Wendy Williams Show segment called "Yaaas & Mess of the Week: #MrStealYourGrandma".

Early life
Irvin was born in Houston, Texas and attended Sterling High School. Irvin earned his bachelor's degree at Texas Southern University and his master's degree from Prairie View A&M University.

References

External links
 Irvin Randle Instagram page
 Irvin Randle Facebook page

Male models from Texas
People from Houston
Living people
1961 births
Texas Southern University alumni
Prairie View A&M University alumni
African-American models
21st-century African-American people
20th-century African-American people